Yooralla (officially the Yooralla Society of Victoria) is one of the largest non-profit disability services organisation in Australia, supporting over 30,000 Victorians living with a disability.

Services
Yooralla employs over 2,100 staff throughout Victoria to provide community services including accommodation, respite, day services, therapy, recreation, education, and self-advocacy to both children and adults. Yooralla also provides a range of assistive and communication technologies through their Independent Living Centre, located in Brooklyn, Melbourne. Yooralla's services are developed in partnership with people with disability and in many cases, their families and carers.

History
The Yooralla Society of Victoria was established in 1977 as a merger of the Yooralla Hospital School and the Victorian Society for Crippled Children.

Yooralla Hospital School (1918–1977)
In 1918, Evangeline Ireland established the Yooralla Free Kindergarten for Crippled Children, a school for disabled children. She was motivated by the discovery of a disabled child whose parents left her in a chicken coop while they were working. It was initially housed in Fitzroy, but after a few months relocated to Carlton, eventually finding a more-or-less permanent home on Pelham Street. During World War II, the school was evacuated to Mount Macedon. It eventually acquired several other properties.

Victorian Society for Crippled Children (1935–1977)
The Victorian Society for Crippled Children was established in 1935 by Eleanor Latham, the wife of Chief Justice Sir John Latham. It was closely tied to the Yooralla Hospital School and the Royal Children's Hospital. After World War II it was renamed the Victorian Society for Crippled Children and Adults. It operated a number of residential hostels for disabled people, as well as recreational facilities and training centres.

Abuse allegations
In November 2014, the Napthine government and the Victorian opposition both pledged to hold an inquiry into the state disability sector in response to an investigation by Four Corners and Fairfax airing allegations that Yooralla failed to act on warnings about a carer who sexually assaulted vulnerable clients. Former National Disability Commissioner Graeme Innes has called for a national inquiry as the National Disability Insurance Scheme would expand the number of group homes for Australians with disability.

In February 2015, the Australian Senate committed to holding a national inquiry into the abuse of disabled people in institutions and homes across Australia.

From February to July 2015, KPMG conducted a review of Yooralla, on behalf of the Department of Health and Human Services (DHHS). The report found that Yooralla has systems and processes that are designed to ensure the delivery of quality and safe services for its clients. It was also found that Yooralla had made significant progress, including major enhancements to work practices.

References

External links
 www.yooralla.com.au – Official site

Medical and health organisations based in Victoria (Australia)
Disability organisations based in Australia
1918 establishments in Australia
Organizations established in 1918
Organisations based in Melbourne